In Blue is a 2017 Dutch drama film directed by Jaap van Heusden. It was shortlisted by the EYE Film Institute Netherlands as one of the eight films to be selected as the potential Dutch submission for the Academy Award for Best Foreign Language Film at the 90th Academy Awards. However, it was not selected, with Layla M. being chosen as the Dutch entry.

Cast
 Maria Kraakman as Lin
 Bogdan Iancu as Nicu
 Ellis van den Brink as Lin's mother
 Maria Rainea as Flori
 Ada Gales as Alex
 Patrick Vervueren as Thomas

References

External links
 

2017 films
2017 drama films
Dutch drama films
2010s Dutch-language films